Cyclidia dictyaria is a moth in the family Drepanidae. It was described by Charles Swinhoe in 1899. It is found in India.

Adults are white, the wings without any transverse markings. The forewings have a discal spot below and the hindwings have a large black spot at the end of the cell. Both wings have a submarginal row of prominent round black spots and a row of indistinct black dots between it and the margin.

References

Moths described in 1899
Cyclidiinae